Stroh is an Austrian spiced rum.

Stroh may also refer to:

 Stroh Brewery Company, a former American beer maker currently owned and operated by Pabst Brewing Company
 Stroh violin, a violin with a metal resonator and horn
 Kaycee Stroh, an American actress
 Stroh's Ice Cream, an American ice cream brand
 Stroh, Indiana, a small town in the United States
 Jacob Gaukel Stroh (1848–1935), a tanner and local historian of Waterloo County, Ontario, Canada
 John Hans Stroh (1916–1996), Australian health advocate, businessman and researcher